This is a list of the Lebanon national football team results from 2020 to present.

Results

2020

2021

2022

Head-to-head records

Notes

External links
 Lebanon results and fixtures on FA Lebanon

2020s in Lebanese sport
2020-29